HSwMS Stockholm was a destroyer of the Royal Swedish Navy that served during the Second World War and in the Cold War. The ship proved to be of very high performance, exceeding  in trials, the fastest ship in the navy. After serving during the Second World War on neutrality patrols, the destroyer took part in two tours with other Swedish warships. The first, which involved sailing to the Netherlands, Norway and the United Kingdom, was led by the cruiser  in 1948. Four years later, the destroyer accompanied the cruiser  to Belgium. In 1961, the destroyer was redesignated a frigate. Three years later, on 1 January 1964, Stockholm was decommissioned and subsequently sold to be broken up.

Design and development

The new design was to have a higher speed, achieved by introducing superheating and lightening the structure through using welding rather than rivets. Stockholm was ordered at the same time as the lead ship of the class and was the second laid down. The two vessels proved successful and the design was subsequently reordered twice, ultimately leading to a class of 6 vessels.

Power was provided by three Penhoët oil-fired boilers feeding two de Laval geared steam turbines driving two shafts. The ship had two funnels.

The main armament consisted of three  K/45 M24C dual-purpose guns produced by Bofors. These were placed in separate mounts on the ship's centreline, with one on the forecastle, one aft and one between the funnels. Air defence consisted six  M/40 autocannons, also provided by Bofors in a twin mounting aft of the bridge and two single mounts surrounding the funnels. Two triple rotating torpedo tube mounts for  torpedoes were aft of the superstructure and two depth charge throwers were carried further towards the stern. Approximately forty mines could also be carried for minelaying. The ship had a complement of 135 officers and ratings.

Construction and career
Stockholm was laid down by Karlskronavarvet in Karlskrona in 1934, launched on 24 March 1936 and commissioned on 24 November 1937. The ship was named after the Swedish capital city and allocated the pennant number J6. In trials, Stockholm proved to be the fastest in the navy, exceeding , a speed only exceeded by the French s.

During the Second World War, Stockholm was involved in patrolling Swedish waters to protect Swedish neutrality. On 10 May 1948, the destroyer sailed from Gothenburg on the first day of a tour of European cities with sister ship  under the leadership of the cruiser . The tour included five days in Bristol, seven days in Amsterdam and four days in Trondheim, returning on 14 June. On 30 May 1952, the same two destroyers escorted the cruiser  on a visit to a port in another NATO country, this time to Antwerp in Belgium, returning on 2 July.

Unlike the later members of the class, Stockholm was not updated in the early 1950s but was nonetheless rerated a frigate on 1 January 1961 along with the rest of the class. On 1 January 1964, the destroyer was decommissioned and subsequently sold to be broken up at Ystad.

References

Citations

Bibliography

 
 
 
 
 
 
 
 
 
 

1936 ships
Destroyers of the Swedish Navy
Ships built in Karlskrona
World War II naval ships of Sweden